Bashir Khaleghi is an Iranian politician and pediatrician. He was born in Khalkhal, Ardabil province. He was a member of the eighth legislative election and Khaleghi is MP of tenth Islamic Consultative Assembly from the electorate of Khalkhal and Kowsar.

References

Living people
1949 births
Deputies of Khalkhal and Kowsar
People from Khalkhal, Iran
Members of the 8th Islamic Consultative Assembly
Members of the 10th Islamic Consultative Assembly
University of Tabriz alumni